Pamonha is a traditional Brazilian food. It is a boiled paste made from sweet corn whisked in coconut milk, typically served wrapped in corn husks.

See also
 Bollos (Panamanian cuisine)
Chimaki, from Japan
Humita
List of Brazilian dishes
Tamales, a similar dish made from a type of dry corn flour
Zongzi, from China
Koba akondro

References

External links
 Pamonha in the Portuguese Wikipedia
 

Dumplings
Brazilian desserts